Nob Yoshigahara Puzzle Design Competition is an annual award and competition in the engineering and design of mechanical puzzles.  The location of the competition rotates between North America, Europe, and Japan.
It was founded in 2001, and has been known since 2005 as the Nob Yoshigahara Puzzle Design Competition, after the renowned puzzler Nob Yoshigahara.

The competition is held in conjunction with International Puzzle Parties founded by Jerry Slocum in 1978, an event dedicated to discussing, showing, and trading of mechanical puzzles.  Due to the postponement of the 2020 International Puzzle Party as a result of the COVID-19 pandemic the 2020 competition was held online only and not in conjunction with the puzzle party event.

2019 winners 
The 2019 competition had 61 entries. The judging took place at the IPP39 which took place in Kanazawa, Japan in August 2019. The Puzzlers' Award went to Koichi Miura for his puzzle 4L Basket. The Jury Grand Prize was given to Slammed Car by Juniche Yananose. The Jury 1st Prize was shared by Laszlo Mero, Gergely Kapolnas and Imre Kokenyesi for Mondrian Blocks, and ali Morris for HoKey CoKey Lock by ali Morris.

Mazeburr L and Rotor were Jury Honorable Mentions created by Diniar Namdarian and Kyoo Wong, respectively.

2018 winners 

The Puzzle of the Year (Jury Grand Prize and Puzzlers’ Award) went to Casino by Volker Latussek. The Grand Jury 1st Prize was awarded to both the 5L Box by Hajime Katsumoto and Trinity by Kyoo Wong.

Jury Honorable Mentions went to: Auzzle A2 by Ilya Osipov, Jigsaw Puzzle 29 by Yuu Asaka, Nosey Puzzle by Alexander E Holroyd, and TicTac's Tactics by Eric Harshbarger.

2017 winners 
Puzzlers' Award: Identical Twins by Osanori Yamamoto; Jury Grand Prize: Kakoi by Shiro Tajima; Jury 1st Prize: Barreled Bolt by Eitan Cher and David Tzur, No Full Pirouette! by Namick Salakhov; Jury Honorable Mention: BurrNova by Jerry McFarland, Free Me 5 by Joe Turner, Puzzle Bracelet by Yael Friedman, and In a Cage by Shiro Tajima.

See also 
 World Puzzle Championship
 World Sudoku Championship
 National Puzzlers' League (NPL)

External links

References 

Puzzle competitions
Recurring events established in 2001